92nd Division may refer to:

 92nd Infantry Division (German Empire)
 92nd Armored Division of the Iranian Army
 92nd Infantry Division (United States)